Tracy Billings may refer to:

Tracy Billings, character in The Hangover Part II
Tracy Billings, character in Happy Face Murders